Edwin Westley Hewitt (born 28 March 1988) is a South African rugby union footballer. His regular playing position is lock. He currently plays for French Rugby Pro D2 side .

References

External links

itsrugby.co.uk profile

Living people
1988 births
South African rugby union players
Rugby union locks
South African people of British descent
Rugby union players from Pretoria
Griquas (rugby union) players
Sharks (rugby union) players
SWD Eagles players